The Connecticut Attorney General is the state attorney general of Connecticut.

The Attorney General is elected to a four-year term. According to state statute, eligibility for the office requires being "an attorney at law of at least ten years' active practice at the bar of this state." A State Supreme Court ruling from 2010, Bysiewicz v. Dinardo Et Al. (SC 18612) attempted to clarify this statute. The court's ruling sets a de facto 10-year residency requirement for candidates and bars those with no litigation experience, although "litigation experience" was left undefined. These requirements are stronger than other states in the area. In New York, the only requirements are being a resident for five years and at least 30 years old. In Massachusetts, the only requirements are being admitted to the state bar and having US citizenship for five years.

The office of the Attorney General was officially created by the Connecticut General Assembly in 1897. The current Attorney General is William Tong, a Democrat serving since January 9, 2019. Tong succeeded retiring Attorney General George Jepsen, a fellow Democrat.

List of attorneys general
Parties

See also
 Connecticut attorney general election, 2010

References

External links
 Connecticut Attorney General official website
 Connecticut Attorney General articles at ABA Journal
 News and Commentary at FindLaw
 Connecticut General Statutes at Law.Justia.com
 U.S. Supreme Court Opinions - "Cases with title containing: State of Connecticut" at FindLaw
 Connecticut Bar Association
 Connecticut Attorney General George Jespen profile at National Association of Attorneys General
  Press releases at Connecticut Attorney General's office